C&G may refer to:

 Casque and Gauntlet, a senior society at Dartmouth College
 City and Guilds of London Institute, an examining and accreditation body
 Cheltenham & Gloucester, a commercial bank in England
 Columbus and Greenville Railway
 Cow & Gate, a manufacturer of baby food and formula milk